Dixonville is an unincorporated community and census-designated place in Santa Rosa County, Florida, United States. Its population was 181 as of the 2010 census. Florida State Road 87 passes through the community. The community name continues north of the state line in Alabama along Alabama State Route 41.

Geography

References

Unincorporated communities in Santa Rosa County, Florida
Unincorporated communities in Florida
Census-designated places in Santa Rosa County, Florida
Census-designated places in Florida